Teymuraz Gabashvili was the defender of title. He didn't start in this year.
Alessio di Mauro won in the final 6–4, 7–6(3), against Vincent Millot.

Seeds

Draw

Final four

Top half

Bottom half

References
 Main Draw
 Qualifying Draw

Zenith Tennis Cup - Singles
Aspria Tennis Cup